Kent Ellsworth Keller (June 4, 1867 – September 3, 1954) was a U.S. Representative from Illinois.

Born on a farm near Campbell Hill, Illinois, Keller attended the public schools in Ava, Illinois. He was graduated from Southern Illinois Normal University at Carbondale in 1890. He engaged as an editor and in the newspaper business in 1890 and 1891. He taught school in Ava, Illinois, in 1893 and 1894, and at Duckwater, Nevada, in 1884 and 1885. Founded the Ava Community High School in 1889 and 1890. He attended Heidelberg University, Germany, in 1891 and 1892. He was graduated from St. Louis (Missouri) Law School in 1896. He was admitted to the bar the same year and commenced practice in Ava, Illinois. He went to Mexico in 1899, where he later engaged in mining. He returned to Ava, Illinois, in 1912 and engaged in literary work. He served in the State senate from 1913 to 1917. He served as delegate to the Democratic National Convention in 1916.

Keller was elected as a Democrat to the Seventy-second and to the four succeeding Congresses (March 4, 1931 – January 3, 1941). He was an unsuccessful candidate for reelection in 1940 to the Seventy-seventh Congress and for election in 1942 to the Seventy-eighth Congress and in 1944 to the Seventy-ninth Congress. He engaged in literary work and lecturing. He served as special adviser to the United States Ambassador at Mexico City from June 1945 to August 1946. He was an unsuccessful candidate for election in 1948 to the Eighty-first Congress and in 1950 to the Eighty-second Congress. He died in Ava, Illinois on September 3, 1954. He was interred in Ava Evergreen Cemetery.

References

External links

1867 births
1954 deaths
Democratic Party Illinois state senators
Democratic Party members of the United States House of Representatives from Illinois